Acraea amicitiae is a butterfly of the family Nymphalidae. It is found in the Afrotropical realm (Zaire and Uganda).

Description

A. amicitiae Heron (= polychroma Rebel ) (59 f). Forewing above black in the basal half with 5 large, angular brown-red spots, two in 1 b, two in the cell and one in the middle of cellule 2, and in the apical half with three small diaphanous spots in 4 to 6. Hindwing above brown-red, in the basal part of cellules 1 a to 2 as far as vein 3 black and with free black discal dots in (4) 5 to 7; before the distal margin with a thick black submarginal line, which is connected with the distal margin by the black veins; on the under surface the basal part as far as the discal dots and the marginal band are dull grey-brown and the interspace forms an anteriorly widened light grey-yellow median band; basal and discal dots all free. Ruwenzori and in 
the mountainous country at the north-west end of Lake Tanganyika.

Biology
The habitat consists of montane forests.
Adult males mud puddle.

Taxonomy
It is a member of the Acraea jodutta species group -   but see also Pierre & Bernaud, 2014

References

External links

Die Gross-Schmetterlinge der Erde 13: Die Afrikanischen Tagfalter. Plate XIII 59 f
Images representing Acraea amicitiae at Bold
Acraea amicitiae amicitiae at Pteron

Butterflies described in 1909
amicitiae